Chikkejamanru is a 1992 Kannada-language drama film directed by Om Sai Prakash. The cast includes V. Ravichandran, Gautami, Jai Jagadish, Shubha and Mukhyamantri Chandru among others. The film was a remake of Tamil film Chinna Gounder directed by R. V. Udayakumar and starring Vijayakanth and Sukanya. The film was also remade in Telugu as Chinarayudu starring Venkatesh and Vijayashanti.

The film featured original score and soundtrack composed and written by Hamsalekha and was produced by Anam Gopalkrishna Reddy for Sri Venkatakrishna Films banner.

Cast 
 V. Ravichandran
 Gautami
 Shubha
 Jai Jagadish
 Mukhyamantri Chandru
 Shivakumar
 Tennis Krishna
 Srilalitha
 Kaminidharan
 Vijay

Soundtrack 
The music was composed and written by Hamsalekha.

See also 
 Chinna Gounder
 Chinarayudu

References

External links 

1992 films
1990s Kannada-language films
Films scored by Hamsalekha
Indian drama films
Kannada remakes of Tamil films
Films directed by Sai Prakash
1992 drama films